Cavalaire-sur-Mer (literally Cavalaire on Sea;  or simply Cavalaira) is a commune in the Var department in the Provence-Alpes-Côte d'Azur region, southeastern France.

History
Cavalaire-sur-Mer is probably derived from an ancient Phoenician colony of the name of Heracles Caccabaria. There are also remains of a Gallo-Roman occupation in Pardigon.

The town was detached from Gassin in 1929.

The village is located on the route of the old railway Saint Raphael–Toulon (sometimes called Train Pignes), now defunct. However, the location of the old railway line can be noted and its path followed (and in much of the coast from Le Lavandou to St. Raphael, Cavalaire is even a "Road Train Pignes").

During World War II, on August 16, 1944, it was one of the sites of a beach landing in Operation Dragoon, the Allied invasion of southern France. Every year, August 15 sees a parade of military vehicles and the reconstruction of a military camp.

Its sister city is New Port Richey, Florida.

Population

See also
 Communes of the Var department

References

External links

Communes of Var (department)
Populated coastal places in France